Caribe dorado (literally "gilt piranha) is a local term for either of 2 species of piranha:

 Serrasalmus gibbus (Castelnau's piranha)
 Serrasalmus spilopleura (speckled piranha)

Piranhas